The Museum of Us (formerly known as the San Diego Museum of Man)  is a museum of anthropology located in Balboa Park, San Diego, California, and is housed in the historic landmark buildings of the California Quadrangle.

History

The museum traces its starting point to the Panama-California Exposition, which opened in 1915 on the occasion of the inauguration of the Panama Canal. The central exhibit of the exposition, "The Story of Man through the Ages," was assembled under archaeologist Dr. Edgar Lee Hewett of the School of American Archaeology (later renamed the School of American Research and since 2007 the School for Advanced Research). Hewett organized expeditions to gather pre-Columbian pottery from the American Southwest and to Guatemala for objects and reproductions of Mayan civilization monuments. Materials were gathered from expeditions sent by anthropologist Aleš Hrdlička of the Smithsonian Institution, who gathered casts and specimens from Africa, Siberia, Alaska, and Southeast Asia. Osteological remains and trepanated crania from Peruvian sites were also obtained. 

A group of citizens led by George Marston formed the San Diego Museum Association to retain the collection and convert it into a permanent museum, with Dr. Hewett as the first director. Notable additions to the museum's collection after the exposition included the Jessop Weapons Collection and a rare collection of artifacts from the ancient Egyptian city of Amarna, donated by Ellen Browning Scripps and the Egypt Exploration Society.

When initially put on display, "The Story of Man through the Ages" was said to be the largest exhibition of its kind anywhere in the world. It became the model on which later exhibitions on human evolution and prehistory, including those at the Field Museum in Chicago, would be based. 

Between 1935 and 1936, the museum's name briefly changed to the Palace of Science to correspond with the California-Pacific International Exposition. During this exposition, the museum housed special exhibitions from a variety of sources, such as the Monte Alban exhibit, which featured many artifacts on loan from the Mexican government.

In 1942, the museum's name was changed to the "Museum of Man" to emphasize the museum's concentration on anthropology. "San Diego" was added in 1978. The museum was converted into a hospital during World War II, and its exhibits and collections were temporarily moved into storage. Following the war, the museum began to focus its collections on the people of the Western Americas. The museum's collections grew substantially from the 1980s through the early 1990s, and contains nearly two million objects today.

The museum is housed in four original buildings from the 1915 Exposition. These include the California Quadrangle, which was designed for the Exposition by American architect Bertram G. Goodhue, and the California Tower, one of the key landmarks in San Diego. The Quadrangle and Tower are listed on the National Register of Historic Places. The exterior sculpture on the building was created by the Piccirilli Brothers.

The main museum is housed in the California Building with its landmark tower. The tower, which had been closed to the public for nearly 80 years, reopened in time for the 2015 centennial of the Panama-California Exposition. The tower contains a carillon and quarterly-hour chimes which can be heard all over Balboa Park.

The museum also occupies three other original 1915 buildings. Administrative offices and an auditorium are housed in the Gill Administration Building, west of the Museum. Originally known as the Balboa Park Administration Building, it was built in 1911 and designed by architect Irving Gill. It was the first building erected in Balboa Park. On the opposite (south) side of the California Quadrangle, housed in what was originally the Fine Arts Building, is Evernham Hall, a banquet room that is also used for temporary exhibits. Immediately adjacent is Saint Francis Chapel, a non-denominational Spanish-style chapel available for private events.

On August 2, 2020, after a several-year process and during a wave of name changes made by institutions all over the world after the murder of George Floyd, the museum officially changed its name to the Museum of Us to be in the perceived ideological spirit of inclusiveness and decolonization.

Collections
The museum's cultural resources and permanent exhibits focus on the pre-Columbian history of the western Americas, with materials drawn from Native American cultures of the Southern California region, and Mesoamerican civilizations, such as the Maya. The museum also holds a collection of Ancient Egyptian antiquities, including burial masks, figurines, and seven painted wooden coffins; one piece is a Ptolemaic child's coffin—only six others are known to exist worldwide. The total holdings include more than 100,000 documented ethnographic items, 300,000 archaeological items, and 25,000 photographic images.

Layout of exhibits

First floor

BEERology:

This exhibit features 10,000 years of beer history and brewing practices including the Ancient Egyptians, Sumerians, Chinese, Amazonian headhunters, and other cultures throughout the world. The exhibit explores ancient and modern beer types and brewing practices, as well as their influential connections to agriculture, religion, and social meaning.

Highlights include the solid gold beer cup of an Incan king (1250 to 1533 A.D.); Peruvian Moche pots, the ancient equivalent to modern day beer growlers; a modern homebrew equipment set; and a short documentary on the San Diego craft beer industry and tradition.

The exhibit also includes a full, hand-crafted bar, which provides space for regular beer tasting events and other private functions. This exhibit was open in 2018.

Maya: Heart of Sky, Heart of Earth: 
 
This exhibit displays several huge Mayan monuments, or stelae, in the Rotunda Gallery. These are casts of the original monuments in Quirigua, a site in Guatemala and were made for the 1915 Panama-California Exposition and have been on display ever since, with the exception of during World War II when the Navy took control of most of Balboa Park and turned the Museum into a hospital. Today, these casts are studied by researchers tracing the history of the Maya through their hieroglyphic writing as the casts are now in better condition than the original monuments, which have suffered weathering and erosion since the casts were made. The exhibition also includes archaeological discoveries highlighting the creativity and beliefs of the ancient Maya: masks, bowls, figurines, etc.

Monsters!

This exhibition is a child-friendly exhibit that incorporates interactive activities which display folk art and other artifacts to tell the stories of more than 50 different monsters and mythical creatures from around the world. Visitors explore the exhibit through the perspective of two children who discover the origins and mythology behind creatures that have captivated world audiences throughout time.

As visitors learn about creatures such as dragons, the yeti, the kraken, unicorns, and bogeyman, they move through various thematic areas, such as a child's bedroom, a forest, a cave and the ocean, which represent various monster habitats.

Interactive activities include a book nook for reading monster storybooks, a magnetic monster wall where children can create their own monsters, and a puppet theater where children can act out monster origin stories. This exhibit was open through 2016.

Second floor
Race: Are We So Different?:

This exhibit explores the social and historical origins of race and racism and helps visitors understand how to deal with them in productive ways. Visitors explore these ideas with hands-on interactive activities, videos, etc.

Post Secret:

For over a decade, millions of people from all over the world have been anonymously sharing their secrets with Frank Warren, founder of the community art project, PostSecret. Each postcard submission is a unique work of art handmade by people who needed to share and release their secret into the world.

Living With Animals:

This exhibit explores our and other cultures' relationship to and with animals, and how it has evolved over time.

Kumeyaay: Native Californians:

This exhibit explores traditional Kumeyaay lifeways, featuring the art of pottery and basket making, food procurement, dress and adornment, traditional medicine, games, and ceremonies. Artifacts and photographs from the museum's collection highlight the rich cultural heritage of the Kumeyaay, offering a glimpse into their lives.

Ancient Egypt:

This core exhibit blends history and science in its presentation of the mummification traditions of Ancient Egypt and other examples of mummification from around the world.

Artefacts exhibited include the authentic remains of two Egyptian mummies, painted mummy coffins and masks, amulets, pottery, and ushabti—all of which date primarily from the Late Period of the Ptolemaic Dynasty. The exhibit also includes a rare child sarcophagus (305-30 B.C.E.), one of seven known to exist in museum collections around the world. Also displayed are several artefacts from the ancient city of Amarna that pharoah Akhenaten, father of King Tut, ruled. One of the key artefacts from the Amarna collection, gifted to the museum by San Diego philanthropist Ellen Browning Scripps, is known as ‘The Missing Cartouche of Nefertiti’, one of the most significant findings from the excavations of the ancient city.

Adventure Kids in Egypt:

This family-oriented exhibit gives younger visitors an opportunity for interactive, sensory learning about ancient Egyptian civilization, and the role of anthropologists and archaeologists in the research and interpretation of the culture. Highlights include interactive games that test skills in archaeology and exploration, an archaeological dig box with artefacts to uncover, a child-sized sarcophagus puzzle, and costumes based on ancient Egyptian garb for children to wear.

Evernham Hall 
Cannibals: Myth & Reality:

This exhibit opened in March 2016, exploring what makes a person a cannibal, how cannibals have been portrayed in popular culture, famous incidents where people resorted to cannibalism to survive, how the human body has been used as medicine, and why some cultures have been falsely labeled as "cannibal".

Special events
The museum also hosts regular beer tastings featuring local San Diego and national craft breweries in conjunction with its BEERology exhibit.

The museum also participates in the annual "December Nights" at Balboa Park.

In popular culture
The California Building and its tower were used by Orson Welles as the principal features of the fictitious Xanadu estate in the classic film Citizen Kane.

The Chuck Norris film Top Dog contains scenes filmed at the Museum of Us.

A building with great resemblance to the museum is featured in the San Diego level of the 2003 video game Tony Hawk's Underground.

References

Further reading
 
 Redman, Samuel J. Bone Rooms: From Scientific Racism to Human Prehistory in Museums. Cambridge: Harvard University Press. 2016.

External links

 

Balboa Park (San Diego)
Museums in San Diego
Art museums and galleries in California
Anthropology museums in California
Native American museums in California
Mesoamerican art museums in the United States
Pre-Columbian art museums in the United States
Museums established in 1915
Landmarks in San Diego
Bertram Goodhue buildings
Spanish Colonial Revival architecture in California
Egyptological collections in the United States
History of San Diego County, California